The 1972 All-Ireland Minor Hurling Championship was the 42nd staging of the All-Ireland Minor Hurling Championship. The championship began on 14 May 1972 and ended on 5 September 1971.

Cork were the defending champions.

On 4 September 1972, Kilkenny won the championship following an 8-7 to 3-9 defeat of Cork in the All-Ireland final. This was their 8th All-Ireland title and their first in ten championship seasons.

Results

Leinster Minor Hurling Championship

Leinster first round

Leinster second round

Leinster semi-finals

Leinster final

Munster Minor Hurling Championship

Munster first round

Munster semi-finals

Munster final

All-Ireland Minor Hurling Championship

All-Ireland semi-finals

All-Ireland final

Championship statistics

Miscellaneous

 Cork became the first team to win seven consecutive Munster Championship titles.

External link
 All-Ireland Minor Hurling Championship: Roll Of Honour

Minor
All-Ireland Minor Hurling Championship